Actinoposthia beklemischevi is an acoel in the family Actinoposthiidae.

References

Acoelomorphs
Animals described in 1965